The Spike Scream Awards inaugurated an annual award show dedicated to the horror, science fiction, and fantasy genres of feature films. The show was created by executive producers Michael Levitt, Cindy Levitt, and Casey Patterson.

The 2006 ceremony was held on October 10, 2006 at the Pantages Theatre in Hollywood, California. The ceremony was hosted by Grindhouse co-stars Rose McGowan, Marley Shelton and Rosario Dawson. Shock rocker Marilyn Manson presented the Scream Rock Immortal Award to Ozzy Osbourne.  Rock groups My Chemical Romance and KoЯn performed.

Special awards
Comic-Con Icon Award - Frank Miller.
Mastermind Award - Robert Rodriguez and Quentin Tarantino.
Scream Rock Immortal Award - Ozzy Osbourne

World premieres
Superman II: The Richard Donner Cut presented by hosts Rosario Dawson, Rose McGowan and Marley Shelton
Grindhouse presented by Robert Rodriguez and Quentin Tarantino
Saw III presented by Tobin Bell, Shawnee Smith and Darren Lynn Bousman

Performances
"Welcome to the Black Parade" performed by My Chemical Romance
"Coming Undone" performed by KoЯn

Competitive categories

Nominees and winners for each announced category are listed below. Winners are listed in boldface.

The Ultimate Scream
Batman Begins
The Devil's Rejects
The Hills Have Eyes
Lost
Superman Returns

Best Horror Movie
The Devil's Rejects
Land of the Dead
High Tension
The Hills Have Eyes
Hostel

Best Fantasy Movie
Pirates of the Caribbean: Dead Man's Chest
Batman Begins
Harry Potter and the Goblet of Fire
King Kong
Superman Returns
Tim Burton's Corpse Bride

Best Science Fiction Movie
V for Vendetta
Aeon Flux
A Scanner Darkly
Serenity
War of the Worlds

Best TV Show
Battlestar Galactica
Doctor Who
Heroes
Masters of Horror
Smallville

Best Sequel
Pirates of the Caribbean: Dead Man's Chest
Batman Begins
The Hills Have Eyes
Saw II
Superman Returns

Best Remake
King Kong
Charlie and the Chocolate Factory
The Hills Have Eyes
The Omen
War of the Worlds

Best Superhero
Brandon Routh as Superman, Superman Returns
Christian Bale as Batman, Batman Begins
Chris Evans as the Human Torch, Fantastic Four
Hugh Jackman as Wolverine, X-Men: The Last Stand
Famke Janssen as Phoenix, X-Men: The Last Stand

Sexiest Superhero
Jessica Alba as The Invisible Woman, Fantastic Four
Famke Janssen as Phoenix, X-Men: The Last Stand
Halle Berry as Storm, X-Men: The Last Stand

Best Screen-To-Comic Adaptation
Army of Darkness

Best Comic-to-Screen Adaptation
X-Men: The Last Stand
Batman Begins
A History of Violence
Superman Returns
V for Vendetta

Most Memorable Mutilation
The Eye Removal, Hostel
Eaten alive, Land of the Dead
Stabbed in a pit of syringes, Saw II
Suicide by shotgun, The Hills Have Eyes
Vaporized by aliens, War of the Worlds

Most Heroic Performance
Johnny Depp as Captain Jack Sparrow, Pirates of the Caribbean: Dead Man's Chest
Christian Bale as Batman, Batman Begins
Viggo Mortensen as Tom Stall, A History of Violence
Edward James Olmos as Commander William Adama, Battlestar Galactica
Hugo Weaving as V, V for Vendetta

Scream Queen

Most Vile Villain
Leslie Easterbrook, Sid Haig, Bill Moseley and Sheri Moon Zombie as the Firefly Family (Mother Firefly, Captain Spaulding, Otis B. Driftwood and Baby respectively), The Devil's Rejects
Tobin Bell as Jigsaw, Saw II
Sir Ian McKellen as Magneto, X-Men: The Last Stand
Cillian Murphy as Scarecrow, Batman Begins
Philippe Nahon as The Killer, High Tension

Breakout Performance
Jennifer Carpenter as Emily Rose, The Exorcism of Emily Rose
Adewale Akinnuoye-Agbaje as Mr. Eko, Lost
Tricia Helfer as Number Six, Battlestar Galactica
Brandon Routh as Superman, Superman Returns
Katee Sackhoff as Starbuck, Battlestar Galactica

The "Holy Sh!t"/"Jump-From-Your-Seat" Award
The eye removal, Hostel
Alien pods emerge from the Earth, War of the Worlds
The diner shootout, A History of Violence
The Space Shuttle/Boeing 777 rescue, Superman Returns
The train sequence, Batman Begins

Best Rack on the Rack
Vampirella
Emma Frost
Lady Death
Power Girl
Wonder Woman

See also
Saturn Award

References

Scream Awards